
Year 188 BC was a year of the pre-Julian Roman calendar. At the time it was known as the Year of the Consulship of Messalla and Salinator (or, less frequently, year 566 Ab urbe condita). The denomination 188 BC for this year has been used since the early medieval period, when the Anno Domini calendar era became the prevalent method in Europe for naming years.

Events 
<onlyinclude>

By place

Greece 
 The leader of the Achaean League, Philopoemen, enters northern Laconia with his army and a group of Spartan exiles. His army demolishes the wall that the former tyrant of Sparta, Nabis, has built around Sparta. Philopoemen then restores Spartan citizenship to the exiles and abolishes Spartan law, introducing Achaean law in its place. Sparta's role as a major power in Greece ends, while the Achaean League becomes the dominant power throughout the Peloponnese.

Roman Republic 
 The continuing quarrels among the Greek cities and leagues increases the conviction in Rome that there will be no peace in Greece until Rome takes full control.
 Through the peace treaty of Apamea (in Phrygia), the Romans force the Seleucid king, Antiochus III, to surrender all his Greek and Anatolian possessions as far east as the Taurus Mountains, to pay 15,000 talents over a period of 12 years and to surrender to Rome the former Carthaginian general Hannibal, his elephants and his fleet, and furnish hostages, including the king's eldest son, Demetrius. Rome is now the master of the eastern Mediterranean while Antiochus III's empire is reduced to Syria, Mesopotamia, and western Iran.

Asia Minor 
 Hannibal flees via Crete to the court of King Prusias I of Bithynia who is engaged in warfare with Rome's ally, King Eumenes II of Pergamum.
 Following the peace of Apamea, Eumenes II receives the provinces of Phrygia, Lydia, Lycia, Pisidia, and Pamphylia from his Roman allies, as the Romans have no desire to actually administer territory in Hellenistic Anatolia but want to see a strong, friendly state in Anatolia as a buffer zone against any possible Seleucid expansion in the future.

China 
 Following the death of Emperor Hui of Han, his mother Empress Lü makes Hui's son Emperor Qianshao of Han and appoints members of her clan as kings, thereby establishing her effective control over China.

Births 
 Jing of Han, emperor of the Chinese Han Dynasty, who ruled from 157 BC (d. 141 BC)

Deaths 
 Hui of Han, the second emperor of the Chinese Han Dynasty, who ruled from 195 BC (b. 210 BC)

References